Chaetocneme critomedia, the banded red-eye or banded dusk-flat, is a species of butterfly of the family Hesperiidae. It is found in Indonesia (Irian Jaya, Maluku), New Guinea and Australia.

The wingspan is about 50 mm.

The larvae feed on various plants, including Blephocarya involucrigera, Annona reticulata, Mallotus polyadenos, Neolitsea dealbata, Syzygium bamagense and Commersonia bartramia.

Subspecies
Chaetocneme critomedia critomedia (Indonesia)
Chaetocneme critomedia sphinterifera (Cape York, Australia)

External links
Australian Insects
The Life History of Chaetocneme critomedia sphinterifera
Australian Faunal Directory

Tagiadini
Butterflies of Asia
Butterflies of Australia
Butterflies described in 1831